Matale District is a district in Central Province, Sri Lanka. It is one of 25 districts of Sri Lanka, the second level administrative division of the country. The district is administered by a District Secretariat headed by a District Secretary (previously known as a Government Agent) appointed by the central government of Sri Lanka. The administrative capital and largest city of the district is Matale.

It is in the northern part of the Central Province. It is bounded to the north by Anuradapura, east by Polonnaruwa, Badulla and Ampara, west by Kurunagala and to the south by Kandy Districts.

Ethnicity and religions

Cities 
 Matale (Municipal Council)

Towns 
 Dambulla (Municipal Council)
 Galewela
 Naula
 Pallepola
 Rattota
 Ukuwela
 Yatawatta

Villages 
 Gammaduwa
 Elkaduwa
 Kaikawala
 Nalanda
 Palapathwela
 Sigiriya
 Wahacotte 
 Wehera
 Maligatenna
 Kawatayamuna

Heritage sites 
 Sigiriya
 Dambulla cave temple
 Aluvihare Rock Temple

Tourist attractions 
Pitawala Pathana
Hunnas Falls
Sembuwatta Lake

References 

 
Districts of Sri Lanka
Kingdom of Kandy
Geography of Matale District